Company is the first studio album by The Drink released on 1 December 2014.

Track listing

References

2014 albums
The Drink albums